The Big Northern Conference (BNC) is an organization of ten high schools in northern Illinois. These high schools are members of the Illinois High School Association.

The high schools of the Big Northern Conference are located in the following counties: Boone, DeKalb, LaSalle, Lee, Ogle, Whiteside, and Winnebago.

History
The conference was formed in 1991 as a football-only union of the Big Eight Conference and the Mid-Northern Conference.  The original 12 members consisted of six Big Eight schools (Burlington Central, Genoa-Kingston, Hampshire, Harvard, Marengo, and Richmond-Burton), five Mid-Northern schools (Byron, Forreston, Oregon, Stillman Valley, and Winnebago), and one independent school (Ottawa Marquette).  Of the remaining football teams from each conference, Pecatonica played in a co-op with Winnebago, Polo and Mt. Morris joined the Upstate Illini Conference, and Huntley played an independent schedule.  Pecatonica, Polo, and Mt. Morris all continued to play in the Mid-Northern in other sports, and Huntley continued to do the same in the Big Eight.

In 1995, the Big Eight and Mid Northern merged for all sports, with Ottawa Marquette remaining the only football-only member.  Forreston left the conference, moving to the Upstate Illini for all sports.  Of the schools from either conference who didn't participate in the football-only merger, Huntley was the only one to join the full merger in 1995, replacing Forreston in football.  Pecatonica (who ended their co-op with Winnebago in football) and Polo joined the Upstate Illini in 1995, while Mt. Morris closed in 1994 and merged with Oregon.

Few more changes occurred over the next 15 years.  Johnsburg replaced Ottawa Marquette for football in 1998 after joining the BNC for all other sports in 1997, Huntley left in 2003 to join the Fox Valley Conference and was replaced by Rockford Lutheran, and Johnsburg left in 2006 to join the Fox Valley and was replaced by North Boone.

The conference has had several changes since 2011 and peaked at 16 schools during the 2014–15 and 2015–16 school years.  Hampshire left for the Fox Valley Conference in 2011 and was replaced by Rock Falls.  Mendota joined for all sports except for football in 2011, but began playing football in the BNC in 2012 along with Rockford Christian who joined that year as a full member.  In 2014, Johnsburg rejoined the conference and Dixon became a new member.

Following the 2015–16 school year, Burlington Central, Harvard, Johnsburg, Marengo, and Richmond-Burton left the BNC to join Woodstock and Woodstock North in creating the Kishwaukee River Conference.  With 11 schools in the 2016–17 school year, the BNC played as one division for the first time in conference history.  In football, BNC schools played against only 8 conference opponents, with the 7 largest schools also playing one game against a team in the KRC.

From 1991–92 to 2005–06, the conference's two divisions for football were determined by school size, with the 6 larger schools in the BNC Red Division and the 6 smaller schools in the BNC White Division (with the exception of Ottawa Marquette, which was in the Red Division from 1991–92 to 1997–98 despite having the smallest enrollment in the BNC).  Other sports also used the Red and White divisions from 1995–96 to 2000–01, but switched to East and West divisions in 2001–02 (football used East and West divisions in 2002–03 before switching back to Red and White divisions the next year).  In 2006–07, the BNC permanently switched to East and West divisions for all sports until it ceased having two divisions in 2016–17.

In 2018, Rockford Christian moved to the Northeastern Athletic Conference in football while remaining in the BNC for all other sports.  Having 10 teams in football made it possible for the BNC to have a full conference schedule, as there are 9 games in the regular season.  Rockford Christian returned to the BNC for football in 2021.

Mendota left the conference after the 2020–2021 school year to join the Three Rivers Conference.

Membership
The conference's current members, as of 2021–22:

Previous Members

Membership timeline 
From 1991–92 to 1994–95, the Mid-Northern Conference and Big Eight Conference continued to play all non-football sports in their respective pre-merger conferences, with a full merger happening at the start of the 1995–96 school year.  Marengo, which was part of the Northwest Suburban Conference during the 1990–91 school year before joining the BNC for football in 1991, joined the Big Eight for all other sports.  Ottawa Marquette was independent in all non-football sports during its entire time associated with the BNC.  Huntley did not accompany the other Big Eight schools in the BNC football merger, playing football independently for 1991 and 1992 and in the Upstate Illini Conference for 1993 and 1994. Pecatonica from 1990–91 to 1994–95 was in a co-op with Winnebago for football, but they continued to play separately in the Mid-Northern Conference in other sports..

State championships 
There have been 39 total IHSA State Championships earned by members of the BNC.  Additionally, there were also 8 championships won by members of the Mid-Northern Conference (1972–73 to 1994–95) and 2 championships won by members of the Big Eight Conference (1980–81 to 1994–95) before the two conferences merged.

Football 

 Richmond-Burton
 1992–93 2A
 Hampshire
 1995–96 2A
 Stillman Valley 
 1999–00 2A
 2000–01 2A
 2003–04 3A
 2009–10 3A
 2013–14 3A
 Byron
 1999–00 3A
2021–22 3A

Cross country (boys) 

 Winnebago
 1978–79 A (as a member of the Mid-Northern Conference)
 2002–03 A
 2005–06 A
 2007–08 1A
 Oregon
 1997–98 A

Cross country (girls) 

 Winnebago
 1989–90 A (as a member of the Mid-Northern Conference)
 1993–94 A (as a member of the Mid-Northern Conference)
 1994–95 A (as a member of the Mid-Northern Conference)
 1995–96 A
 1999–00 A
 2000–01 A
 2002–03 A
 2005–06 A
 2006–07 A
 2007–08 1A
 2008–09 1A
 2009–10 1A
 2019–20 1A

Golf (boys) 

 Byron
 2007–08 1A
 2015–16 1A
 2016–17 1A

Soccer (boys) 

 Winnebago
 2008–09 1A

Basketball (girls) 

 Byron
 2015–16 2A
 2016–17 2A

Bowling (girls) 

 Winnebago
 2006–07

Wrestling (boys) 

 Harvard
 1991–92 A (as a member of the Big Eight Conference)
 Byron
 1994–95 A (as a member of the Mid-Northern Conference)
 Oregon
 1997–98 A

Baseball 

 Rockford Christian
 2014–15 2A

Softball 

 Marengo
 2010–11 3A

Soccer (girls) 

 Rockford Lutheran
 2006–07 A

Track and field (boys) 

 Oregon
 2008–09 1A

Track and field (girls) 

 Genoa-Kingston
 1988–89 A (as a member of the Big Eight Conference)
 Byron
 2009–10 1A
 2010–11 1A

Chess 

 Stillman Valley
 1989–90 A (as a member of the Mid-Northern Conference)

Scholastic Bowl 

 Winnebago
 1992–93 A (as a member of the Mid-Northern Conference)
 1994–95 A (as a member of the Mid-Northern Conference)
 Byron
 1999–00 A
 Stillman Valley
 2002–03 A

Notes

References

External links
 Illinois High School Association, Official Site

High school sports conferences and leagues in the United States
Illinois high school sports conferences
High school sports in Illinois